Corfu is a village in Genesee County, New York, United States. The population was 709 at the 2010 census. It is named after the Greek island of Corfu.

The village of Corfu lies along the southern edge of the town of Pembroke; about  within the village limits are within the town of Darien to the south.

History 

The early community was known as "Longs Corners". The name "Corfu" was adopted when a post office was established. The village of Corfu was incorporated in 1868.

Geography
Corfu is located in western Genesee County at  (42.958662, -78.403938). New York State Route 33 passes through the village as Main Street, leading east  to Batavia, the county seat, and west  to Buffalo. New York State Route 77 (Alleghany Road) intersects NY 33 in the center of Corfu, leading north, then west  to Lockport and south  to Java Center.

Murder Creek, a tributary of Tonawanda Creek, flows to the west through the village.

Demographics

As of the census of 2000, there were 795 people, 309 households, and 211 families residing in the village. The population density was 804.2 people per square mile (310.1/km2). There were 336 housing units at an average density of 339.9 per square mile (131.0/km2). The racial makeup of the village was 96.98% White, 0.88% African American, 0.63% Native American, 0.38% from other races, and 1.13% from two or more races. Hispanic or Latino of any race were 1.38% of the population.

There were 309 households, out of which 36.9% had children under the age of 18 living with them, 55.3% were married couples living together, 9.4% had a female householder with no husband present, and 31.7% were non-families. 24.3% of all households were made up of individuals, and 9.7% had someone living alone who was 65 years of age or older. The average household size was 2.57 and the average family size was 3.11.

In the village, the population was spread out, with 28.3% under the age of 18, 7.8% from 18 to 24, 32.5% from 25 to 44, 19.7% from 45 to 64, and 11.7% who were 65 years of age or older. The median age was 35 years. For every 100 females, there were 89.7 males. For every 100 females age 18 and over, there were 88.1 males.

The median income for a household in the village was $37,386, and the median income for a family was $46,667. Males had a median income of $32,917 versus $23,571 for females. The per capita income for the village was $15,909. 1.4% of families and 4.2% of the population were below the poverty line, including 2.6% of those under age 18 and 7.5% of those age 65 or over.

References

External links
 Village of Corfu official website

Villages in New York (state)
Villages in Genesee County, New York